Oman sent a delegation to compete in the 2020 Summer Paralympics in Tokyo in Japan originally scheduled to take place in 2020 but postponed to 23 July to 8 August 2021 because of the COVID-19 pandemic. This was the country's ninth successive appearance in the Summer Paralympics since debuting at the 1988 Summer Paralympics.

Medalists

Competitors

Athletics 

Men's field

Women's field

See also
 Oman at the 2020 Summer Olympics

References

Nations at the 2020 Summer Paralympics
2020
2021 in Omani sport